Marco Calamita (born 22 March 1983) is an ex Italian footballer who currently is  a football manager.

Biography

Early years 
Marco Calamita was born in Bitonto  and Apulia had met in football, which he then played on the road. At age eight he was then emigrated with his parents from Italy and went to Germany, where the family settled in Fellbach in Swabia in Baden-Württemberg near Stuttgart. In Fellbach he also joined a football club, in the case of Calamita the SV Fellbach and the detour Stuttgarter Kickers he went to VfB Stuttgart.

International career 
Shortly after his 18th birthday he received from Uli Stielike an invitation to a seminar of the U-18 national team in Germany, however, no career resulted in the junior national teams of Germany, because he did not want to apply for a German passport.

References

External links
Marco Calamita at Kicker

1983 births
Living people
Footballers from Bari
Association football forwards
Italian footballers
Italian expatriate footballers
Italian emigrants to Germany
Stuttgarter Kickers II players
SC Verl players
SV Elversberg players
SV Wehen Wiesbaden players
SV Wacker Burghausen players
Eintracht Braunschweig players
Eintracht Braunschweig II players
Stuttgarter Kickers players
VfR Aalen players
2. Bundesliga players
3. Liga players
Expatriate footballers in Germany
SC Pfullendorf players